Jaunsar-Bawar is a hilly region in Garhwal division of Uttarakhand, northern India. It is located in the north-west of Dehradun district, along the border with the state of Himachal Pradesh.

Ethnically, Jaunsar-Bawar comprises two regions, inhabited by the two predominant groups: Jaunsar, the lower half, while the snow-clad upper region is called Bawar, which includes, the 'Kharamba peak'.  Geographically adjacent, they are not very different from each other. The Bawar lies in the upper regions of the area. They are a unique community because they have remained cut off from the external world for centuries, leading to the retention of their unique culture and traditions, which have attracted historians, anthropologist and studies in ethnopharmacology to this region for over a century. There is a significant cultural shift from other people of Garhwal, living close by.

Jaunsar-Bawar region 
The Jaunsar-Bawar region, is a valley, spread over 1002 km2 and 398 villages(villages near koti colony,Sahiya market Kalsi, Sakani, Kanbua and Kakadi), between 77.45' and 78.7'20" East to 30.31' and 31.3'3" North. It is defined in the east, by the river Yamuna and by river Tons in the west, the northern part comprises Uttarkashi district, and some parts of Himachal Pradesh, the Dehradun tehsil forms its southern periphery.

Modes of livelihood in this region are agriculture and animal husbandry, which in the upper region is mostly for self-sustenance, as merely 10 percent of cultivated area is irrigated. Milk, wool and meat are an integral part of the local economy.

History
Jaunsar- Bawar was a part of sirmaur Kingdom at one point of time, which is now sirmaur district in Himachal pradesh. It is the border area of Garhwal region in Uttarakhand. Later, It was captured by Garhwal rulers. Garhwal King Mahipat or Mahipati Shah sent Army General Lodi Rikhola to stop looting in Dehradun valley. The looters from Sirmaur region (Himachal Pradesh) were disturbing subjects of Doon valley.

Capable administrator and a warrior Lodi Rikhola was called upon to put an end to this mischief by the looters of Sirmaur, who were plundering in Doon valley very frequently. Lodi Rikhola captured the forts of Kalsi Garh, Jaunsar  (old capital of Sirmaur), Kani Garh, Bairat Garh and other nearby forts. After that, Sirmaur King Mat Prakash or Mandhata Prakash could never free those forts from Garhwal Kingdom.

According to Bhakt Darshan, Lodi Rikhola threw the looters of Sirmaur out from Garhwal region with brave and cruel methods. Lodi Rikhola entered into Sirmaur region and killed the looters and their leaders. Due to his terror in Sirmaur, the king swore to stop looters going to Garhwal.

In 1829, Jaunsar-Bawar was incorporated in Chakrata tehsil, prior to which it had been a part of Punjab state of Sirmur, until the British conquered it along with Dehradun after the 1814 war with the Gurkhas.

Before the establishment of British Indian Army cantonment in 1866, the entire area was known as Jaunsar-Bawar, and the name continued to be in popular use for the region, until the early 20th century. While western Hindi is popular in most of the neighbouring hill areas, Jaunsari, a language of the Western Pahari group, is spoken by most of the people of the region.

Geography
Traditionally, Jaunsar-Bawar region is known for its rich reserves of forested areas, in the high hills region, with trees of Deodar, Pine, and spruce, made for it becoming an important destination for the timber even during the British period, when the logs were rolled down the slopes and floated on Yamuna river to Delhi. Gate system, time table based traffic diversion on one way hilly roads, which was there since the time of British, is now removed.

Culture
There is a rigid caste system. The Upper caste, consisting of Thakurs, Brahmins are the landowners. The Lower caste include Luhar, Bajgi and Kolta.

The culture of the local Jaunsari people is distinct from neighboring Garhwal and Himachal Pradesh, though there are some similarities as well. Its culture is a bit closer to Sirmaur and Shimla district of Himachal Pradesh, as Jaunsar-Bawar paragana has been part of sirmaur hill kingdom of Himachal Pradesh for a long time. In 1814 when Gorkha were moving ahead in capturing all hill kingdom forts, while capturing  from Kumaun, some parts of Garhwal at the time of famine and massive earthquake in Garhwal, they laid seize to several parts of Himachal including shimla, Kangra. Hill Raja of Himachal decided to seek the help of Maharaja Ranjit Singh. The Kangra Raja offered the Sikhs the Fort for the long term if they could make the Gurkhas leave. Some of the Forts that the Gurkhas built still exist in Himachal Pradesh like the Dhar Mountain Fort, the Malaon Fort, Bansar Fort, Subathu Fort and Parwanoo Fort.

Ludwig Stiller writes in his epic book “The Rise of the House of Gorkha” that Maharaja Ranjit Singh sent a letter to General Amar Singh Thapa in August 1809 asking him to peacefully give up the Kangra Fort and vacate the whole area to the Sikhs and in return he offered Gurkhas military help, whenever they came into conflict with the British, which was clearly inevitable, but Amar Singh Thapa refused.

Maharaja Ranjit Singh had no other option except the Military one now as a conflict with the Gurkhas could not be avoided. The Gurkhas lost in the end and as a result of which the Gurkhas were evicted from the Kangra Fort and all the territories there of. Maharaja Ranjit Singh now sat firmly in command of the Kangra Fort and surrounding Hill States braced up for the Gurkha retaliation.

Jaunsari language shares its vocabulary with Garhwali language. However, its accent and grammar is some sort of similar to people of those of Shimla and Sirmaur region i.e. area lying in western side of Giri river, comprises Rajgarh, Paonta, Renuka, Nahan, pacchad and Shillai tehsils. These people are also known as Hatti, and has similar culture like Jaunsari people. People's Union for Civil Liberties, PUCL Bulletin, September 1982. Some, anthropology studies in the 1990s revealed that tribal marriage practises were fast phasing out, and is being replaced by monogamy and these practices do not exist now 

An important aspect of their culture are festive sports and dances like the folk dance named 'Barada Nati'/Harul/Raso/ during all festive occasions, like 'Magh Mela' which is the most important festival of the Jaunsaries. It is marked by an animal sacrifice ritual, which celebrates the killing of 'Maroj', an ogre, which according to local legends, stalked the valleys for years.

According to local village lore, the Pandavas and Kauravas figure in the anthropology of the Tons valley and some families claim to be direct descendants of the two clans. The Jaunsaris claim to be descendants of the Pandavas, while the Bawaris are from the Kauravas or Duryodhana's clan. The two cultures usually do not mix, and it is a rare occurrence to see the two cultures mix in terms of marriage or social custom.

One unique custom which is followed here is the concept of bride price. The custom owes its origin to some strong logic. The parents spend a substantial amount on raising, educating and making the life of the girl as good as they can make it. In return the girl is an asset to the family as she cooks, cleans, and works on the farms. When a boy wants to marry the girl, he is taking away an asset of the family and must pay the fair price of the asset known as the bride price. But over the year this practice is followed by a few masses.

Divorce is not a taboo in this culture, and divorced women are not ostracised from society. However, if the woman comes back to the parents' home after a divorce, the family must pay back the bride price to the man's family. If the woman divorces her husband to marry another man, the second man must pay  bride price to the first man's family.. But over the years this practice is followed by a few masses.

During festivals, people wear the Thalka or Lohiya, which is a long coat.

Architecture
Jaunsar Bawar follows the Vernacular architecture components. Houses are usually built in stone and timber and roofed with slate tiles. It is usually a two or three storey structure with a linear arrangement of one to four rooms on each floor and is typically sited on a terraced piece of land along the contours of the hill. In many villages in Uttarakhand, due to low temperature range, the housing and other buildings of socio-cultural values are generally shaped like pagodas or have sloping roofs.

The common building material used under construction includes wood (generally deodar, due to its abundance and durability), plain stones and other locally available materials like mud and stone slates. One of the important aspects of architecture in the area is the wooden carvings and the slate laden gabled roofs.

As temple architecture commonly develops from the form of folk houses, the figure of a small temple is not so different from that of a folk house. Therefore, the oldest and simplest temple type in this region is a single storied structure covered with a gabled roof.

Since the local deity is Lord Mahasu, most of the temples are dedicated to him. Famous temples include Mahasu Devta Temple at Hanol, Mahasu Temple at Bulhad(Bharam Khat) Temple at Thaina, Mahasu Temple at Lakhwar, Mahasu Temple at Lakhsiyar and newly constructed Mahasu Temples in Bisoi and lohari

Medicine

The Jaunsari people of the region has been using over 100 plants for the treatment of various ailments, which have remained a subject for many Ethnobotanical and Ethnopharamcological studies.

In Media
Raaste Band Hain Sab, a film based on the work of Dr. Jayoti Gupta, Dept. of Sociology, Delhi University, on Jaunsar-Bawar, and made by Manjira Dutta, won the National Film Award for Best Anthropological/Ethnographic Film in 1988.

"Dance With GODS", the First chapter of the documentary Jaunsar Bawar : An Alternate Life highlights the centuries-old deity rituals and sacred ceremonies. The latter part shows a tradition that is celebrated annually and has an interesting storyline of its existence.
Bollywood playback singer Jubin Nautiyal hails from this region.

Further reading 
 Himalayan Polyandry: Structure, Functioning and Culture Change. A Field-Study of Jaunsar-Bawar by D. N. Majumdar. New York, Asian Publishing House. 1962.
 The Abode of Mahashiva: Cults and Symbology in Jaunsar-Bawar in the Mid Himalayas by Madhu Jain. 1995, Indus Publishing Company, .
 Ritual complex and social structure in Jaunsar-Bawar (Census of India, 1971, series 1, India), Office of the Registrar General, India 1974.

See also
 Lakhamandal

References

External links 
 
Detailed data about the region

Dehradun district
History of Uttarakhand